In mathematics, the notion of a divisor originally arose within the context of arithmetic of whole numbers.  With the development of abstract rings, of which the integers are the archetype, the original notion of divisor found a natural extension.

Divisibility is a useful concept for the analysis of the structure of commutative rings because of its relationship with the ideal structure of such rings.

Definition

One says that a is a two-sided divisor of b if it is both a left divisor and a right divisor of b; the x and y above are not required to be equal.

When R is commutative, the notions of left divisor, right divisor, and two-sided divisor coincide, so one says simply that a is a divisor of b, or that b is a multiple of a, and one writes . The associate relationship is an equivalence relation on R, so it divides R into disjoint equivalence classes.

Note: Although these definitions make sense in any magma, they are used primarily when this magma is the multiplicative monoid of a ring.

Properties 

Statements about divisibility in a commutative ring  can be translated into statements about principal ideals.  For instance,

 One has  if and only if .
 Elements a and b are associates if and only if .
 An element u is a unit if and only if u is a divisor of every element of R.
 An element u is a unit if and only if .
 If  for some unit u, then a and b are associates.  If R is an integral domain, then the converse is true.
 Let R be an integral domain. If the elements in R are totally ordered by divisibility, then R is called a valuation ring.

In the above,  denotes the principal ideal of  generated by the element .

Zero as a divisor, and zero divisors 
 Some authors require a to be nonzero in the definition of divisor, but this causes some of the properties above to fail.
 If one interprets the definition of divisor literally, every a is a divisor of 0, since one can take .  Because of this, it is traditional to abuse terminology by making an exception for zero divisors: one calls an element a in a commutative ring a zero divisor if there exists a nonzero x such that .

See also 
 Divisor
 Zero divisor
 GCD domain

Notes

References 

Ring theory